Sir John Lovekyn (fl. 1342–1366) was a City of London fishmonger who was three times Lord Mayor of London.

He was Warden of London Bridge from 1342 to 1350 and became an alderman of the city in 1347. He served as Sheriff of the City of London in 1342 and first became Lord Mayor in 1348, and was elected to a second term in 1358. His third term was more unexpected. On 28 October 1365, Adam de Bury was elected Lord Mayor by the Aldermen of the City. However, on 28 January 1366, de Bury was removed from office and John Lovekyn was elected Mayor by order of King Edward III.

He was elected Member of Parliament as one of the two aldermanic representatives for the City of London in 1344, 1346 and twice in 1348.

See also
List of Sheriffs of the City of London
List of Lord Mayors of London
City of London (elections to the Parliament of England)
Kingston Grammar School

References

John Lovekyn at british-history.ac.uk

14th-century lord mayors of London
English MPs 1344
Sheriffs of the City of London
Members of the Parliament of England for the City of London
Knights Bachelor
English MPs 1346
English MPs 1348